Frithjof Clausen (13 March 1916 – 9 May 1998) was a Norwegian wrestler. He was born in Kolbotn, and represented the club Kolbotn IL. He competed in Greco-Roman wrestling at the 1948 Summer Olympics in London, where he placed sixth, and at the 1952 Summer Olympics in Helsinki.

References

External links
 

1916 births
1998 deaths
People from Kolbotn
Wrestlers at the 1948 Summer Olympics
Wrestlers at the 1952 Summer Olympics
Norwegian male sport wrestlers
Olympic wrestlers of Norway
Sportspeople from Viken (county)
20th-century Norwegian people